The Naval Recruitment Training Agency (NRTA) originally called the Naval Training Department  was first established in 1944 as a department within the Admiralty it underwent numerous name changes until 1 April 1995 as a new agency of the Navy Department of the British Ministry of Defence. Its role was to contribute to the operational capability of the United Kingdom Armed Forces by recruiting to the Naval Service, delivering training to the Defence community  it was administered by the Chief Executive (NRTA)/Flag Officer, Training and Recruitment  it was abolished in 2005.

History
The Navy first established a naval training department in December 1944 under the command of Rear-Admiral John W. Durnford, until 1951  when it was renamed the Department of the Deputy Chief of Naval Personnel(Training) administered by Rear-Admiral Charles F.W. Norris. In 1960 the department was then renamed the Directorate-General, Training until 1969 when it was abolished. In 1972 a new training organization was re-established called the  Directorate-General, Naval  Manpower and Training placed initially under the command of Vice-Admiral David Williams the directorate lasted until 1994. A new Naval Recruiting and Training Agency (NRTA) was launched in April 1995.  It was an agency of the Ministry of Defence (MoD).  The chief executive of NRTA  was the Flag Officer, Training and Recruitment he also held the joint post of Director-General Naval Training and Education. The agency was headquartered at the Victory Building, HM Naval Base Portsmouth.  The agency was responsible for the recruitment and training of personnel for the Royal Navy, and additionally to recruit for the Royal Marines. In addition it managed the Royal Naval Reserve and the University Royal Naval Units. The NRTA provided support to maritime-related youth organisations such as combined cadet forces, recognised sea scout units and volunteer cadet. The Agency was a subsidiary department of the Office of the Second Sea Lord and consisted of 21 training schools.

In command of training

Director of Naval Training
Post holders included:

 Rear-Admiral John W. Durnford: December 1944-August 1947
 Rear-Admiral Philip Ruck-Keene: August 1947-July 1949
 Rear-Admiral John F. Stevens: July 1949-August 1950
 Rear-Admiral Charles F.W. Norris: August 1950 – 1951

Deputy Chief of Naval Personnel, (Training)
Post holders included:

 Rear-Admiral Charles F.W. Norris: 1951-July 1952
 Rear-Admiral Maxwell Richmond: July 1952-July 1954 
 Rear-Admiral Benjamin Bryant: July 1954-February 1957
 Rear-Admiral R. Thomas Sandars: February 1957-August 1958 
 Rear-Admiral Norman E. Denning: August 1958-May 1959

Director-General of Training
Post holders included:
 Vice-Admiral Sir Norman E. Dalton: May 1959-April 1960 
 Vice-Admiral Sir Nigel S. Henderson: April 1960-July 1962
 Rear-Admiral John M.D. Gray: July 1962-January 1965
 Rear-Admiral Thomas H. Maxwell: January 1965-January 1967
 Rear-Admiral George W. Gay: January 1967 – 1969

Director-General, Naval Manpower and Training
Post holders included:
 Vice-Admiral David Williams: April 1972-February 1974
 Rear-Admiral Raymond D. Lygo: February 1974-June 1975
 Vice-Admiral A. Desmond Cassidi: June 1975-December 1977
 Vice-Admiral Sir John S.C. Lea: December 1977-January 1980
 Rear-Admiral Peter G.M. Herbert: January 1980-November 1981
 Rear-Admiral Nicholas J.S. Hunt: November 1981-November 1983
 Rear-Admiral Robert W.K. Gerken: November 1983-May 1985
 Rear-Admiral D. Benjamin Bathurst: May 1985-November 1986
 Rear-Admiral Brian T. Brown: November 1986-July 1988
 Rear-Admiral Neville Purvis: July 1988-December 1990
 Rear-Admiral Michael H.G. Layard: December 1990-March 1992
 Rear-Admiral Nicholas J. Wilkinson: March 1992-April 1994
 Rear-Admiral John P. Clarke: April 1994-January 1996

Chief Executives (NRTA) and Flag Officer Training and Recruitment
Post holders included:
 Rear Admiral John McAnally CB MVO, 1996-1998
 Rear Admiral John Chadwick CB, 1998-2001
 Rear Admiral Peter R Davies CBE, 2001-2003
 Rear Admiral K J Borley, 2003-2005

Footnotes

Sources
 (ed.), Elayne Coakes ... (2002). Knowledge management in the sociotechnical world : the graffiti continues. London ; Berlin ; Heidelberg ; New York ; Barcelona ; Hong Kong ; Milan ; Paris ; Singapore ; Tokyo: Springer. .
 Heyman, Charles (2006). The Armed Forces of the United Kingdom 2007–2008. Oxford, England: Casemate Publishers. .
  Inspectorate, Adult Learning. "Inspection Report Naval Recruiting and Training Agency" (PDF). reports.ofsted.gov.uk. OFSTED, H.M. Government UK, 11 March 2005.
 Mackie, Gordon. "Royal Navy Senior Appointments from 1865" (PDF). gulabin.com. Gordon Mackie, p. 199. December 2017.
 "Ministry of Defence Agencies". (2008), The Army Quarterly and Defence Journal. Volume 125. West of England Press, Bristol England.

 

Military units and formations established in 1995
Military units and formations disestablished in 2005
Naval education and training in the United Kingdom
1995 establishments in the United Kingdom
2005 disestablishments in the United Kingdom